William Fishbourn or Fishbourne (June 25, 1677 in Talbot, Maryland – May 27, 1742 in Philadelphia) was a wealthy merchant and mayor of Philadelphia for three one-year terms, 1719 to 1722.

Family
Fishbourn was the son of Ralph Fishbourne and Sarah Lewis.

Before 1700, he settled in Philadelphia. There, on January 8, 1702, he married Hannah Carpenter (March 3, 1685 – July 25, 1728), daughter of Samuel Carpenter, a deputy governor of Pennsylvania. After her death, he married Jane Roberts on June 29, 1729.

His granddaughter Elizabeth Fishbourne (September 1, 1752 – April 24, 1826) married President of Pennsylvania Thomas Wharton Jr.

References

1677 births
1742 deaths
People from Talbot County, Maryland
Mayors of Philadelphia
Colonial American merchants
People of colonial Maryland
People of colonial Pennsylvania